Virginia Ruano Pascual and Paola Suárez were the two-time defending champions, but were defeated in the final by Kim Clijsters and Ai Sugiyama 7–6(7–5), 2–6, 7–9.

Seeds

  Virginia Ruano Pascual /  Paola Suárez (finals)
  Kim Clijsters /  Ai Sugiyama (champions)
  Lindsay Davenport /  Lisa Raymond (third round)
  Cara Black /  Elena Likhovtseva (semifinals)
  Jelena Dokic /  Nadia Petrova (third round)
  Svetlana Kuznetsova /  Martina Navratilova (third round)
  Petra Mandula /  Patricia Wartusch (third round)
  Liezel Huber /  Magdalena Maleeva (first round)
  Daniela Hantuchová /  Chanda Rubin (semifinals)
  Conchita Martínez /  Meghann Shaughnessy (first round)
  Janette Husárová /  Barbara Schett (quarterfinals)
  Nathalie Dechy /  Émilie Loit (quarterfinals)
  Tina Križan /  Katarina Srebotnik (second round)
  Shinobu Asagoe /  Nana Smith (second round)
  Emmanuelle Gagliardi /  Patty Schnyder (third round)
  Janet Lee /  Wynne Prakusya (first round)

Draw

Finals

Top half

Section 1

Section 2

Bottom half

Section 3

Section 4

External links
Draw
Order of play
WTA official archive
2003 French Open – Women's draws and results at the International Tennis Federation

Women's Doubles
French Open by year – Women's doubles
French Open – doubles
French Open – doubles